La Possession is a commune in the French overseas department of Réunion. It is located on the northwest side of the island of Réunion, between the capital of Saint-Denis and the commune of Le Port.

To the territory of this commune belongs the major part of the Cirque of Mafate, a caldera of the dormant Piton des Neiges volcano. It is part of the Réunion National Park.

History
The territory of the commune of La Possession belonged to the commune of Saint-Paul until 1895.

In 1675 the first settlements were led by Jean Marquet (a creek was named for him). In 1699 sugar cane concessions were attributed to Texer de Mota, a Portuguese from India

From 1730-1767 construction of Chemin Crémont created the first paved walkway to the capital Saint-Denis. In 1797 the Rivière des Galets concession was attributed to Dr Rivière.

In 1833 a chapel was constructed, later replaced by a church. 1834: Still belonging to the commune of Saint-Paul, Réunion the territory of the futur commune becomes special section. From 1849–1854 La route de la Montagne (Mountain road)  was built; the first reliable road connection to Saint-Denis.

In 1860 the lazaret of La Grande Chaloupe was constructed, which became the quarantine station of Réunion. In 1882 the railway Saint-Denis - Saint-Pierre and the harbour of Le Port were constructed. In 1886 the first steamers enter the new Pointe des Galets harbour. 1890 saw the creation of the La Possession commune. In 1895 part of the territory at the Pointe des Galets was split off to become the commune of Le Port.

In 1976 the new coastal highway to Saint-Denis was opened along with the closure of the railway Saint-Denis - Le Port

Demographics

Geography

Most of the caldera of Mafate belongs to the commune. Hiking trails connect Dos d'Âne via the river valley of Rivière des Galets to Grand Place and other îlets. Other trails connect La Possession to Saint-Denis, via La Grande Chaloupe.

At La Grande Chaloupe the partly restored lazaretto and the former train station can be visited. They have exhibitions about the history of the Réunion railroad, the lazaretto and indentured servitude in Réunion.

Hotels
Local hotels include:
 Lodge Roche Tamarin
 Le Pilon D'or

Climate

La Possession has a subtropical highland climate (Köppen climate classification Cwb).

Education
Three collèges and one lycée support the commune:

 Collège Jean Albany, with 1130 students (2005)
 Collège Texeira da Motta.
 Collège R.Verges, with 740 students (2005)
 Lycée Moulin Joli, with 1060 students (2006)

Sister cities

  Port Louis (Mauritius)
  Villeneuve-d'Ascq (Metropolitan-France)
  Antanifotsy (Madagascar)
  Foshan (China)
  Barakani (Anjouan - Comoros)

Gallery

See also
Communes of the Réunion department
 Mafate valley and caldera
 La Grande Chaloupe

References

External links

 Official website

Communes of Réunion